The Gateway Mall in St. Louis, Missouri is an open green space running linearly, one block wide, from the Gateway Arch at Memorial Drive to Union Station at 20th Street. Located in the city's downtown, it runs between Market Street and Chestnut Street. 

In the early 21st century, there are plans to remodel areas of the mall for additional uses and to make it more attractive to visitors. City planners hope to incorporate the many downtown locations into one mall area.

History

Early history
The Mall began as part of the Comprehensive Plan of 1907, which embraced City Beautiful principles held by members of the City Plan Commission.  That plan originally called for the removal of buildings between 13th and 14th streets from Clark north to Olive streets to form a new park mall.  This did not take place, and different players pushed the similar Central Traffic-Parkway plan in 1912.  This intended to clear buildings between Tucker and Jefferson in a one-block-wide trip between Market and Chestnut streets.  A later phase of the project would have extended the mall as far as Grand Avenue.  It had the support of Mayor Henry Kiel, but in a 1915 referendum on the plan, voters defeated it.

The City Plan Commission published another downtown plan in 1919.  The Public Building Plan called for the clearing of buildings for a park space between 12th and 14th streets.  The first section between 12th and 13th would extend from Market north to Olive by the Central Library.  The second, between 13th and 14th, would be between Market and Chestnut.  This was approved by voters in 1923 with an $87 million bond to support acquisition and demolition of properties for certain spaces.

In 1939, as part of the Gateway Arch National Park (then known as the Jefferson National Expansion Memorial), a park was built with the aid of federal funds during the Great Depression between 3rd and 4th streets between Market and Chestnut.

In 1940, the city commissioned Carl Milles to design a fountain, The Meeting of the Waters, on Aloe Plaza in front of Union Station.

In the 1950s, city leaders completed the park blocks between 15th and 18th streets.

In 1965, voters approved a $2 million bond issue to build Kiener Plaza on the block between Broadway and 6th street. In 1966, voters defeated a demolition plan to extend the mall to Kiener Plaza, but the city moved forward.  It secured one block between 10th and 11th streets, demolished the buildings and developed the park space in 1976.  It proved unpopular, and the block was redesignated as the site of Richard Serra’s sculpture Twain .

Pride Plan
In 1982, mayor Vincent Schoemehl announced a public-private partnership called the Pride Redevelopment Corporation.  The Pride plan was to remove the remaining buildings in the mall and construct smaller five-story buildings on the northern halves of each block to anchor park spaces on the southern halves.  Three large historic office buildings, the Title Guarantee, Buder and International buildings, were pulled down by the end of 1984.  During the two years that followed, a group of smaller historic buildings, known as Real Estate Row, were demolished, although all had been designated by the National Park Service as eligible for the National Register of Historic Places.  

Only one half-block office building was constructed, the 15-story Gateway One. The building was criticized as demonstrating the very qualities it was created to replace.  Its height obstructed the view of the Arch, which was supposed to be highlighted along the Mall. In addition, its mass made the section of the mall on its block seem private and inaccessible.

In 1992, Schoemehl promised to complete the Mall before he left office. In 1994, his administration cleared the two blocks between 8th and 10th streets for the mall, in the process removing the landmark Western Union Building.

Master Plan

A Master Plan was commissioned for the mall in 2007 by mayor Francis Slay.  It defined the mall as a series of outside 'rooms' and promoted design of a unifying "hallway" to run along the southern edge of the mall. Each room was to serve a function related to the buildings adjacent to it. Next to the Serra sculpture, a sculpture park was called for. Next to the Library, City Hall, and the Civil Courts Building, a civic room to hold public events was recommended.  Next to the Plaza Square apartment complex, a neighborhood room with family facilities was needed.  At the end by Union Station, planners recommended a feature that would indicate the end of the Mall, so a terminus section was designated. These rooms were intended to interact with each other and the buildings beside them.

Citygarden, the sculpture park "room," opened in 2009 to great acclaim.  It was one of the rooms called for in the Mall's master plan.  Following this, a conservancy group was formed to maintain the mall, help raise money for this purpose, and carry out the rest of the objectives of the master plan.

Features

Luther Ely Smith Square

The Luther Ely Smith Square is controlled by the National Park Service, and is located directly between the Arch Grounds and the Old Courthouse. It is named after Luther Ely Smith, who organized the design competition for a landmark that resulted in selection of Saarinen's design for the Arch. 

Memorial Drive, which runs along Interstate 70 between the Gateway Mall and the Gateway Arch, has often been cited by locals as having a pedestrian access problem.  The current landscaping of the Smith Square, which focuses on symmetry, draws pedestrians to its edges away from its interior.  It has been designated by the National Park Service as an orientation area. Under plans for renewal of the Arch area, the accessibility issue was corrected. 

As winners of the 2009 international Framing a Modern Masterpiece design contest, Michael Van Valkenburgh Associates re-imagined Luther Ely Smith Square extending to form a park over Interstate 70, physically connecting the Arch grounds to the city of St. Louis for the first time. In November 2015, this plan was brought to fruition with completion of the first component of the CityArchRiver project. 

To the north is the Hyatt Regency St. Louis Riverfront hotel.  To the south are the Drury Plaza Hotel and KMOV-TV.

Old Courthouse

The Old St. Louis County Courthouse was a combination federal and state courthouse in St. Louis, Missouri that was Missouri's tallest habitable building from 1864 to 1894. It is now part of the Gateway Arch National Park.

Land for the courthouse was donated in 1816 by Judge John Baptiste Charles Lucas and St. Louis founder René Auguste Chouteau  Lucas and Chouteau required the land be "used forever as the site on which the courthouse of the County of St. Louis should be erected."  The Federal style courthouse was completed in 1828.

The courthouse was abandoned in 1930 by the county courts when the Civil Courts Building was built.  Descendants of Chouteau and Lucas sued to regain ownership.  In 1935, during the Great Depression, St. Louis voted a bond issue to raze nearly 40 blocks around the courthouse in the center of St. Louis for the new Gateway Arch National Park, which was then known as the Jefferson National Expansion Memorial. President Franklin D. Roosevelt declared in an Executive Order the area would be a national monument.  The courthouse formally became part of the new monument area in 1940.

The roof was replaced in 1941. It was rehabilitated in 1955 and 1985. The courthouse remained the largest structure in the monument until the Gateway Arch was built in 1965.

Notable cases
In 1846 slaves Dred Scott and his wife Harriet sued for their freedom in a case heard in this courthouse. Their master had held them at a military fort in the Minnesota Territory, which was free, before bringing them back with him to Missouri, a slave state. In previous freedom suits, the Missouri courts had frequently respected laws of neighboring free states and territories which ruled, "once free, always free". It had decided in favor of freedom for slaves who had been taken and held voluntarily by their masters in a free state for extended periods of time (generally a period to distinguish between through travel and residency.) All of the Scott state trials, including a Missouri Supreme Court hearing, were held in this building.  Increasing tension between the North and the South on slavery resulted in the court ruling against the Scotts. The case was ultimately decided by the U.S. Supreme Court in Dred Scott v. Sandford, which ruled against him.  The Court also ruled that the Missouri Compromise was unconstitutional and said that slaves had no rights under the US Constitution. This ruling polarized sides and increased tensions in the run up to the American Civil War.
In 1872 Virginia Minor attempted to vote in a St. Louis election and was arrested, as women had not yet received the franchise. Her trials, including the deliberations before the Missouri Supreme Court, were held in the building. The case was eventually appealed to the United States Supreme Court in Minor v. Happersett, which upheld the male-only voting rules.

Kiener Plaza

Kiener Plaza occupies the full width of the Mall between North 7th Street and North Broadway. It sits immediately north of the Ballpark Village, developed in the early 21st century. The land is owned by Southern Real Estate and Financial Company and leased to the city of St. Louis.

In 2017, renovations were completed to Kiener Plaza as part of the CityArchRiver project.

Gateway One

Built in the 1980s as a replacement for three historic structures that previously occupied the mall, Gateway One was built on the northern portion of the block with a park on the southern half.  The original intention was to bring economic activity to the mall with new buildings, but to keep them of moderate scale to define the northern side of the mall.  Gateway One was the only building constructed in this portion. It is much taller than planned, and its mass has caused the adjoining park to take on the quality of a private plaza instead of a continued portion of the Gateway Mall. Gateway One is the headquarters of Peabody Energy. It has been criticised by many for the blandness of its design and for its obstruction of the view of the Arch. Gateway One was designed by Robert L. Boland, and completed in 1985.

To the north is the Wainwright Building designed by noted 20th-century architect Louis Sullivan.  To the south is 700 Market Street.

Citygarden

Citygarden is an urban sculpture park donated by the Gateway Foundation in 2009. It includes art by many famous sculptors including: Donald Baechler, Tom Claassen, Jonathan Clarke, Niki de Saint Phalle,  Jim Dine, Mark Di Suvero, Jean-Michel Folon, Laura Ford, Keith Haring, Fernano Leser, Aristide Maillol, Ju Ming, Igor Mitoraj, Julian Opie, Tom Otterness, Mimmo Paladino, Martin Puryear, George Rickey, Tony Smith, Bernar Venet, Kan Yasuda, and Jack Youngerman.

Richard Serra's Twain
This sculpture by Richard Serra dominates an entire block.  It was designed specifically for the location and is intended to give viewers insights and perspectives as they walk around it. It was previously located in a green square by itself, a location that did not have much pedestrian traffic. Plans are in the works to make the sculpture more accessible by the public and more connected to Citygarden.

To the north is AT&T Center and the Southwestern Bell Building.  To the south is the Bank of America building and the KSDK TV and Cable Studios; south of that is the Thomas F. Eagleton Federal Courthouse.

Civil Courts Building

The Civil Courts Building (sometimes referred to as the St. Louis Pyramid) is a landmark court building used by the 22nd Judicial Circuit Court of Missouri in St. Louis.

The building with its pyramid-shaped roof is frequently featured in the center of photos of the Gateway Arch from the Illinois side, as its location on the Memorial Plaza is lined up in the middle directly behind the Old Courthouse.

The building was part of an $87 million bond issue ratified by voters in 1923 to build monumental public buildings along the Memorial Plaza. These included Kiel Auditorium and the Municipal Services Building.  The Plaza and the buildings were part of St. Louis's City Beautiful plan and were intended to establish a monumental center for important functions.

It replaced the Old Courthouse as the city and county court building. Its construction prompted the descendants of Auguste Chouteau, who had donated land for the courthouse, to sue to regain control of the Old Courthouse, as it was no longer being used for court purposes. They were unsuccessful. 

The pyramid roof on the top was designed to resemble the Mausoleum of Maussollos, which was one of the Seven Wonders of the Ancient World. It features 32 Ionic columns (8 on each side). They are made of Indiana limestone.

These creatures were sculpted by Cleveland sculptor, Steven A. Rebeck.

To the south is the Mel Carnahan Courthouse, the federal courthouse.

Civic Room

The Civic Room is made up of five blocks of green space surrounding Soldier's Memorial and the War Memorial.  It is adjacent to the downtown Central Library.  The Civic Room is planned to become the predominant space for outdoor festivals and events.  Chestnut Street will be closed for three blocks to include a fountain and spaces for event tents. An outdoor stage has also been planned. It is bounded by 12th and 15th streets, Market, and Olive.

In the middle of the Civic Room is Soldier's Memorial Plaza. To the north of the Civic Room, is the Central Library. The Washington Avenue Loft District runs parallel to the Mall beyond that.  The New Life Evangelistic Center and The Jefferson Arms apartments.
To the south of the park blocks are the Stifel Theatre and City Hall, designed in the French gothic style.

Central Library
The Central Library, designed by Cass Gilbert, is set apart from the Civic Room across Olive Street.

Soldiers Memorial
Soldiers Memorial is an island surrounded by the Civic Room.

Stifel Theatre
The Stifel Theatre (originally the Kiel Opera House, later the Peabody Opera House) is an anchor to this section of the mall. It contributes to the care of the  adjacent grounds.

Neighborhood Room

Currently made up of two blocks, the Neighborhood Room will be between 15th and 18th streets.  Adjacent to the residential Plaza Square apartments and the downtown post office, this section of the mall is to be one of primarily residential usage, with facilities for families, such as sand-volleyball courts and youth soccer fields.

To the north is Plaza Square, a 1960s apartment complex. To the south is the Abrams Federal Building and the St. Louis Post Office

Terminus

The terminus extends from 18th Street west to the I-64 exit ramps.  It includes Aloe Plaza and the Carl Milles fountain, The Meeting of the Waters.  The fountain is a reference to St. Louis' place at the confluence of the United States' two great rivers, the Missouri and Mississippi. The western block in the Terminus is currently an inaccessible park. The master plan describes it as the site of a future observation earthwork mound, to be built similar to the ancient Monk's Mound of Cahokia, the center of the indigenous Mississippian culture, which extended throughout the Mississippi and Ohio valleys. 

To the south of the Terminus is Union Station.

Union Station
Union Station, a major railroad station, was redeveloped for retail purposes after railroad restructuring accompanied reduced passenger traffic. In the early 21st century, the building also includes a Marriott Hotel, a Hard Rock Cafe, a lake, and Union Station stop on the MetroLink, the light rail system.

I-64 Interchange
In the original St. Louis highway plan, officials intended to have an additional north-south highway connecting to I-64.  The interchange is there, but the highway is not. This space will be reclaimed for development as a job center by the NorthSide project. It should have a new boundary at 22nd Street.

References

External links
 Gateway Mall Master Plan

Gateway Mall
Gateway Mall